Aleksander Čonda (born 26 August 1990) is a Slovenian motorcycle speedway rider.

Career
Čonda was a member of the Slovenian national team at 2009 Speedway World Cup. He medalled six times at the Slovenian Individual Speedway Championship. Although he won 3 silver medals and 3 bronze medals he never became champion of Slovenia, being denied the gold medal 3 times by Matej Žagar.

During the 2009 Polish second division and 2011 Polish second division seasons, he rode for KSM Krosno in the 2 liga. In between (2010) he rode for Hungarian side Miskolc in the 1 Liga.

Results

World Championships 
 Team World Championship (Speedway World Team Cup and Speedway World Cup)
 2009 - the Event 2 will be on 13 July
 Individual U-21 World Championship
 2008 - 11th place in the Qualifying Round 2
 2009 - 14th place in the Semi-Final 1
 Team U-21 World Championship (Under-21 World Cup)
 2008 - 4th place in the Qualifying Round 2
 2010 - 4th place in the Qualifying Round Two

European Championships 
 Individual European Championship
 2009 - qualify to the Semi-Final 1, but was replaced
 Individual U-19 European Championship
 2008 - 11th place in the Semi-Final 3
 2009 -  Tarnów - 13th place (5 pts)

See also 
 Slovenia national speedway team

References 

1990 births
Living people
Slovenian speedway riders